The I-Shou International School, a bilingual school, is an international school in Dashu District, Kaohsiung, Taiwan.  I-Shou International School is the first school in Taiwan that is authorized  to offer the International Baccalaureate (IB) Primary Years Program (PYP), Middle Years Program (MYP) and the IB Diploma Program (DP). In 2015, the school was accredited by the Council of International Schools (CIS).

See also
 Education in Taiwan

References 

2004 establishments in Taiwan
Boarding schools in Taiwan
Educational institutions established in 2004
High schools in Taiwan
International Baccalaureate schools in Taiwan
Primary schools in Taiwan
International schools in Kaohsiung